The Bayer designations q Puppis and Q Puppis are distinct. Due to technical limitations, both designations link here. For the star

q Puppis, see HD 70060
Q Puppis, see HD 63744

See also
QW Puppis
QZ Puppis

Puppis, q
Puppis